The Lateran Cross is a medal for recognition of merit. It was bestowed by the Cathedral chapter of the Archbasilica of Saint John Lateran with authorisation of the Holy See.

History
The Lateran Cross was commissioned by Pope Leo XIII, and instituted on February 18, 1903. The distinction was created as a recognition of merit, and is named in honor of the Basilica of St. John in Lateran in Rome. Initially, it was awarded for donations regarding the restoration of the Lateran Basilica.

The distribution of the award was continued after the completion of the restoration process. Paul VI ended the awarding of the Lateran Cross in 1977.

Appearance
The decoration consists of a Greek cross displaying the image of St. John the Evangelist on the right, St. John the Baptist on the left, St. Peter at top, and St. Paul at the bottom. Christ the Redeemer is displayed at the center of the cross. The reverse side of the cross is engraved with the names, in Latin, of each saint depicted (Joanes, Batis, Petrus, Paulus), as well as the symbol of Christ (P and X inside a circle).

A button located above the cross is inscribed with the phrase: Sacrosancta lateranensis ecclesia - omnium urbis et orbis ecclesiarum mater et caput (The sacred and holy church of the Lateran - the mother and the head of all of the churches of the city and the world).

The medal has been crafted in a number of designs: with or without an adjoining circle, as well as a solid medal with a cross in relief. The accompanying ribbon is red with blue stripes along the sides.

Recipients 
Notable individuals who received this honor include:
 Aaron Bradshaw Jr. (United States)
 Max Corvo (United States)
 Vincent James Scamporino, United States, OSS.
 William Joseph Donovan (United States)
 Władysław Drapiewski (Poland)
 Ricardo Lancaster-Jones y Verea (Mexico)
 Wolfgang Mayer-König (Austria)
 Constancio C. Vigil (Argentina)
Antonio Conticelli (USA)

References
 Storia Illustrata, n. 248, July 1978. Milan: Arnoldo Mondadori Editore.

Orders, decorations, and medals of the Holy See
Awards established in 1903
Recipients of the Papal Lateran Cross
1903 establishments in Vatican City
1977 disestablishments in Vatican City